LCIA may refer to:

 Libin Cardiovascular Institute of Alberta
 Licentiate of the Commonwealth Institute of Accountants
 London Court of International Arbitration
 Life Cycle Impact Analysis, phase of LCA aimed at evaluating the significance of environmental impacts